Konstantinava is a village in Jonava district municipality, in Kaunas County, in central Lithuania. According to the 2011 census, the village had a population of 1.

Demography

References

Villages in Jonava District Municipality